Karl Schrott (born 9 January 1953) is a former luger from Austria who competed in the late 1970s and early 1980s. He won the bronze medal in the men's doubles event at the 1980 Winter Olympics of Lake Placid, New York.

Schrott's best overall Luge World Cup finish was second twice in the men's doubles event (1978-9, 1979–80).

References

1953 births
Living people
Austrian male lugers
Olympic lugers of Austria
Olympic bronze medalists for Austria
Lugers at the 1980 Winter Olympics
Olympic medalists in luge
Medalists at the 1980 Winter Olympics